U.S. Highway 180 (US 180) is a US highway that runs from Valle, Arizona, to Hudson Oaks, Texas. A child route of U.S. Route 80, the Texas portion of U.S. 180 consists of two distinct segments. Separated by an approximately 105 mile stretch of roadway travelling through southeast New Mexico, the first segment travels through far west Texas from the New Mexico border near El Paso to the New Mexico border approximately 25 miles west of Carlsbad, New Mexico. The second segment begins on the Texas state line between Hobbs, New Mexico, and Seminole and travels east across the lower Panhandle and Cross Timbers regions, passing through the towns of Lamesa, Snyder, Albany, and Breckenridge. The terminus of the second segment, which is also the highway's eastern terminus, is at an interchange with Interstate 20 (I-20) in Hudson Oaks, between Weatherford and Fort Worth.

Route description

Trans-Pecos
The entire section of US 180 through the Trans-Pecos region is concurrent with other highways.

US 180 enters into Texas from New Mexico concurrent with Interstate 10 and US 85 in Anthony. The three highways enter El Paso with US 85 leaving near Sunland Park Mall. I-10/US 180 run along the northern edge of downtown El Paso together, with US 180 leaving and joining U.S. Route 62 at Paisano Drive. The two highways run along east El Paso on Montana Avenue, a major thoroughfare. The highways run along the southern border of El Paso International Airport and Fort Bliss, before intersecting with Loop 375, leaving the city shortly thereafter. After leaving the city, US 62/180 travel through or near several rural suburbs and subdivisions such as Homestead Meadows North, Homestead Meadows South, and Butterfield. The two highways briefly travel through the Guadalupe Mountains National Park near Pine Springs. US 62/180 enters New Mexico approximately 25 miles northwest of Pine Springs.

Northwest Texas
US 180, still in concurrence with US 62, reenters Texas between Hobbs, New Mexico and Seminole. In Seminole, the highways split, with US 62 joining U.S. Route 385 and travelling north to  Seagraves and Brownfield. US 180 continues east, sharing a short overlap with U.S. Route 87 in Lamesa, before continuing east through the towns of Gail and Snyder. US 180 continues to run in a predominantly east-west direction through northwest Texas, passing through towns such as Breckenridge and Mineral Wells. US 180 ends at an interchange with Interstate 20 in Hudson Oaks, about 30 miles west of Fort Worth.

Future
A section of US 62/US 180 in eastern El Paso, known locally as Montana Avenue, is currently being upgraded to a six-lane freeway. The project will be built in two phases; phase one will be from Global Reach Drive/Yarbrough Drive to Tierra Este Road (just east of Loop 375) and was originally scheduled to open in summer 2022. The current eastbound lanes of Montana Avenue will serve as the eastbound frontage road of the future freeway while the old westbound lanes will be converted into the freeway's eastbound lanes. Construction of phase 2, from Tierra Este Road to Zaragoza Road, has not started as funding for that section has not been secured yet.

Junction list

References

1 in Texas
Transportation in Borden County, Texas
Transportation in Culberson County, Texas
Transportation in Dawson County, Texas
Transportation in El Paso County, Texas
Transportation in Fisher County, Texas
Transportation in Gaines County, Texas
Transportation in Hudspeth County, Texas
Transportation in Jones County, Texas
Transportation in Palo Pinto County, Texas
Transportation in Parker County, Texas
Transportation in Scurry County, Texas
Transportation in Shackelford County, Texas
Transportation in Stephens County, Texas